The Twitchell 12 is an American sailboat that was designed by Ron Holder as a day sailer for people with limited mobility and first built in 1991.

Production
The design was built by W. D. Schock Corp in the United States, from 1991 until 1993, with 27 boats completed, but it is now out of production.

Design
The Twitchell 12 is a recreational sailing dinghy, built predominantly of fiberglass, with wood trim. It has a fractional sloop rig with a jib boom, a raked stem, a reverse transom, a transom-hung rudder controlled by a cockpit joystick and a retractable daggerboard. It displaces .

See also
List of sailing boat types

Similar sailboats
Martin 16

References

External links
Photo of a Twitchell 12

Dinghies
1990s sailboat type designs
One-design sailing classes
Sailboat type designs by Ron Holder
Sailboat types built by W. D. Schock Corp